Laureana Toledo (born 1970) is a Mexican conceptual artist.

Life and background 
Toledo was born in Ixtepec, Oaxaca, Mexico in 1970, and lives and works in Mexico City. Toledo is the daughter of Mexican artist Francisco Toledo. Her siblings include artist Dr. Lakra and poet Natalia Toledo.

Career 
She began as a photographer, and later incorporated drawing, painting, video, sound and sculpture into her work. From January to March 2009, she was an artist in residence at Gasworks, a contemporary art organisation in South London, UK. She has been on the artists council of and is a co-founder of SOMA, an educational art space in Mexico City which hosts international artists, curators, critics, and art historians in residential programs.

According to a SOMA Summer artist-in-residence description,Laureana is inspired by the imperceptible or transient moments of the everyday, speculating on how such phenomena can gain new forms of visual presentation. Her work often involves systematic and repetitive interventions into different media (texts, books, photographs, paintings, etc.) to re-code their existing narratives.In 2019, Toledo exhibited an installation at Museo Jumex in Mexico City. She selected books, records and films from Mick Jones's, of The Clash, private collection.

Exhibitions 
Strategics Questions, Kunstlerhaus Bethanien, Berlin, 2005.
Declaraciones 2, Museo Nacional Centro de Arte Reina Sofía, Madrid, 2005.
Laureana Toledo/Sam Samore, Galería OMR, Mexico City, 2005.
Nombres propios, Caja Negra, Madrid, 2008.
Abstract Cabinet,  in collaboration with John Taylor of Duran Duran, Eastside Projects, Birmingham, 2009.
Yes, Trolley Gallery, London, 17 March 2010
...but it often rhymes, Museo Jumex, Mexico City, January – March 2019

Bibliography 
Espacio de experimentación sonora + arte en vivo, 2015 : sound experimentation space + live art, 2015. Ciudad de México: MUAC, Museo Universitario Arte Contemporáneo, Universidad Nacional Autónoma de México, 2016.

References

1970 births
Living people
Mexican artists
Mexican contemporary artists